Lee Jung-hyun (born 1 September 1958) is a South Korean politician. He was a member of the National Assembly and the delegate of Saenuri Party. He is also known as the first Jeolla Province born delegate of the conservative Saenuri Party since democratization in the 1980s, and widely regarded to have broken the regional discrimination in his Gyeongsang Province-oriented party as the party's first chairman from Jeolla regions. He is also regarded as one of President Park's closet aides, and this has stirred substantial unease recently during President Park's scandals in late 2016.

External links
Lee Jung-hyun at korea.assembly.go.kr

References

Members of the National Assembly (South Korea)
Liberty Korea Party politicians
Dongguk University alumni
People from South Jeolla Province
1958 births
Living people